USS Federal (ID 3657) was a freighter acquired by the U.S. Navy during World War I.  She was completed at the end of the war and supplied Allied troops in Europe with food and horses, and, on return trips to the United States, brought troops back home. After three round transatlantic trips in supporting the troops, she was returned to the U.S. Shipping Board, which eventually sold her in 1937. She then became the British freighter Federlock which was captured in 1941 by the Japanese, who renamed the ship the Hakusan Maru. The ship sailed carrying Japanese cargo until sunk by an American submarine in 1945.

Constructed in Kearny, New Jersey 

Federal, a 6868 gross ton (13,130 tons displacement) freighter, was built at Kearny, New Jersey, as part of the World War I shipbuilding effort. Completed on 11 November 1918, the day the Armistice ended the fighting, the new ship was turned over to the Navy and commissioned as USS Federal (ID # 3657) on 15 November.  She was commissioned the following day.

World War I service

Carrying food and horses to the Allied troops 
Operated by the Naval Overseas Transportation Service, and fitted out to carry horses, she made her maiden round-trip voyage between late November 1918 and late January 1919, carrying cargo, including horses, to France and from there back to the United States.

In March 1919 Federal sailed again with cargo for France and on her return voyage in April brought home over 500 U.S. Army medical personnel. On her third voyage, in May and June 1919, she transported hay and oats to Antwerp, Belgium, for the Northern Food Administration and brought a cargo of steel billets back to New York City.

Post-war decommissioning 
USS Federal was decommissioned on 17 June 1919 and returned to the U.S. Shipping Board.

Subsequent history 
Federal remained in the hands of the U.S. Shipping Board until 1937, then became the British cargo ship Federlock. In December 1941, while on time charter to a Japanese ship operator, she was seized by Japan at the beginning of World War II in the Pacific, becoming Hakusan Maru.

Hakusan Maru landed 550 members of the Imperial Japanese Navy's Maizuru Special Naval Landing Force on Kiska in the Aleutian Islands in June 1942 at the beginning of the Aleutian Islands campaign. Later in the war, she took survivors from the shipwreck of Asaka Maru from Taiwan to Moji on Kyushu, arriving on 28 August 1944.

She was reportedly lost to a torpedo from the American submarine  on 11 June 1945.

References 

 
 USS Federal (ID # 3657), 1918-1919. Originally, and later, S.S. Federal (1918) 
 NavSource Online: Federal (ID 3657)

 

Design 1037 ships of the United States Navy
Ships built in Kearny, New Jersey
1918 ships
World War I cargo ships of the United States
World War I auxiliary ships of the United States
World War II merchant ships of Japan
Ships of the Aleutian Islands campaign
Ships sunk by American submarines
World War II shipwrecks in the Pacific Ocean
Captured ships